Phibunsongkhram (sometimes spelled Phibunsongkhram, Pibunsongkhram or Pibulsonggram) may refer to:

Plaek Phibunsongkhram, anti-communist ruler of Thailand (1897–1964)
Nitya Pibulsonggram, Thai career diplomat and politician (b. 1941)
Krissanapoom Pibulsonggram, Thai singer and actor (b. 1996)
Phibunsongkhram Province (พิบูลสงคราม), former province of Thailand corresponding to Cambodian Siem Reap Province